Skinners Shoot is a small locality in the Northern Rivers region of New South Wales, Australia. It is located approximately 4 km southwest of Byron Bay. In 2006, Skinners Shoot had a population of 275 people.

Notes

Towns in New South Wales
Northern Rivers